

Distribution

A36 is largely limited to Africa. Outside Africa, more than half of the populations have no A36 and the majority that do, have only trace levels. The exception is in Central/East Central Asia. This appears not to be coincidental. HLA DR3-DQ2 linkage and frequency indicates a strong possibility of a recent migration from either North or West Africa in which the DR3-DQ2 (notably DRB1*0302) and A*33-B*58 haplotypes were carried into and redistributed from Central Asia into the surrounding populations.

References

3